Lhokseumawe, is the second largest city in Aceh province, Indonesia. The city covers an area of 181.06 square kilometres, and had a population of 171,163 at the 2010 census and 188,713 at the 2020 census; the official estimate as at mid 2021 was 189,941. The city is a key regional centre important for the economy of Aceh.

History 
The name Lhokseumawe comes from the words lhok and seumawe. Lhok means "deep", "bay", and "ocean trenches", and Lhokseumawe means the swirling water in the sea along the offshore of Banda Sakti and its surroundings. The city was formerly part of North Aceh Regency. The area is linked to the emergence of the kingdom Samudera Pasai around the 13th century, which later came under the sovereignty of Sultanate of Aceh in 1511.

Pre Colonial Era 

The Sultanate of Aceh was established by Sultan Ali Mughayatsyah in 1511. Later, during its golden era, in the 17th century, its territory and political influence expanded as far as Satun in southern Thailand, Johor in Malay Peninsula, and Siak in what is today the province of Riau. As was the case with most non-Javan pre-colonial states, Acehnese power expanded outward by sea rather than inland. As it expanded down the Sumatran coast, its main competitors were Johor and Portuguese Malacca on the other side of the Straits of Malacca. It was this seaborne trade focus that saw Aceh rely on rice imports from north Java rather than develop self sufficiency in rice production.
After the Portuguese occupation of Malacca in 1511, many Islamic traders passing the Malacca Straits shifted their trade to Banda Aceh and increased the Acehnese rulers' wealth. During the reign of Sultan Iskandar Muda in the 17th century, Aceh's influence extended to most of Sumatra and the Malay Peninsula. Aceh allied itself with the Ottoman Empire and the Dutch East India Company in their struggle against the Portuguese and the Johor Sultanate. Acehnese military power waned gradually thereafter, and Aceh ceded its territory of Pariaman in Sumatra to the Dutch in the 18th century.

Colonial Era 

Before the 20th century, the country was ruled by uleebalang Kutablang. in year 1903 after resistance fighters against Dutch colonists weakened Aceh, Aceh began to master.

Lhokseumawe be conquered areas and from then on the status of Lhokseumawe be Bestuur Van Lhokseumawe with Zelf Bestuurder is Teuku Abdul Lhokseumawe subordinate Controeleur aspirants and also domiciled in Lhokseumawe and assistant resident district officer or Regent.

In the second decade of the 20th century, among the entire mainland of Aceh, a small island about 11 km2 widely separated by Krueng Cunda River. filled buildings General Government, Military, and Transportation Railway by the Dutch government. Small islands with villages of Keude Aceh, Kampung Jawa, Kuta blang, Mon Geudong, Teumpok Teungoh, Hagu Kampung, Uteuen bayi and Ujong Blang are entirely new 5,500 plural in Lhokseumawe call. Building by building fills this land until the city has realized embryos harbor, market, railway station and the offices of government agencies.

Independence era 
On 21 September and 22 September 1953, DI/TII forces attacked Lhokseumawe twice and the government forces repelled the attack.

Since the Declaration of Independence, the Government of the Republic of Indonesia has not established systemic to this district. At first Lhokseumawe combined with Bestuurder Van Cunda. The mainland population is increasingly crowded, coming from surrounding areas such as Buloh Blang Ara, Matangkuli, Blang Jruen, Lhoksukon, Nisam, cunda and Pidie.

In 1956 the Emergency Law No. 7 of 1956, the autonomous regions formed districts within the region of North Sumatra province, where one of them is the North Aceh district with its capital Lhokseumawe.

Then In 1964 the Decree of the Governor of Aceh Special Region Number 34/GA/1964 dated 30 November 1964, it was determined that Kemukiman Banda Sakti in Muara Dua, the District used its own under the name of the District Banda Sakti.

Based on the Act No. 5 of 1974 on the Principles of Regional Administration, Lhokseumawe be likely to improve the status of the City of, on August 14, 1986, with the Regional Regulation No. 32 of 1986 Establishment of the City of Lhokseumawe signed by President of Indonesia Suharto, which was inaugurated by the Minister of Roestam Soeparjo country on August 31, 1987. Given that it is de jure and de facto Lhokseumawe has become the City of the area of 181.06 km2 which includes 101 villages and 6 urban villages in five districts, namely: District of Banda Sakti, Muara Dua, Dewantara, Muara Batu, and Blang Mangat.

Since 1988 the idea of improving the status of municipality began Kotif Lhokseumawe be pursued so that he went on to Law No. 2 of 2001 on the establishment of Lhokseumawe dated June 21, 2001 signed by the president of Indonesia Abdurrahman Wahid, whose territory includes three districts, namely the districts of Banda Sakti, Muara Dua and Blang Mangat. In year 2006 the district of Muara Dua was split into two - Muara Dua and Muara Satu - so Lhokseumawe now has four districts.

Geography 
Lhokseumawe City is located between 4˚ - 5˚ North Latitude and 96˚ - 97˚ East Longitude with an average altitude of 13 meters above sea level. Lhokseumawe was given the status of an independent city (separate from North Aceh Regency, which surrounds it on all the landward sides) based on Law Number 2 of 2001, dated 21 June 2001. Lhokseumawe City is divided into 4 districts, 9 residents, 68 villages, and 259 sub-villages within the boundaries of the area. Lhokseumawe forms a semi-enclave within North Aceh Regency.

Climate
Lhokseumawe has a tropical rainforest climate (Af) with moderate to heavy rainfall year-round.

Administrative districts 

Lhokseumawe City is an urban expansion of Aceh Utara Regency and is located on the east coast of Sumatra. Being between Banda Aceh and Medan, Lhokseumawe City holds a strategic position as a distribution channel for trading traffic in Aceh Special region.

When formed in 2001, the city was divided administratively into three districts (kecamatan); since then, the creation in 2004 of Muara Satu District (formerly part of Muara Dua District) has increased the number to four. These are tabulated below with their areas and their populations at the 2010 and 2020 censuses, together with the official estimates as at mid 2021.

Source : Lhokseumawe Dalam Angka 2013 / Lhokseumawe In Figures 2013 Badan Pusat Statistik, Jakarta, for later figures.

Judging by the number of village officials, Blang Mangat District is the biggest district, consisting of 22 villages, 78 sub villages, and 259 village officials.

Health 

Health facilities are available in Lhokseumawe :

The number of available health workers is:

note : Not include private companies, Only Government Facilities and worker
Source : Lhokseumawe Dalam Angka 2013 / Lhokseumawe In Figures 2013

Religious 

Religious facilities are available in Lhokseumawe :

Source : Lhokseumawe Dalam Angka 2013 / Lhokseumawe In Figures 2013

Tourism 

Some attractions are rated strongly support the ability of future Tourism Sector is:
 Ujong Blang Beach
 Rancong Beach
 Seumadu Island
 Reklamasi Pusong Beach
 Meuraksa Beach
 KP3 Beach
 Krueng Cunda River
 Waduk Pusong
 Riyadhah Park
 P. Ramlee Village (seniman besar Malaysia, asal Aceh).

Transportation

Airport 
 Air : Malikussaleh Airport & Lhoksukon Airport

Seaport 
 Sea : Kruengeukeuh Seaport

Road and highway 
 Land: Terpadu Terminal

Public transport 
One of the unique features of Lhokseumawe city are the motorized rickshaws known as Becak Motor or Becak Mesin. The becaks are found almost everywhere. The fare to ride a becak is relatively cheap and is usually negotiated beforehand before you go.

There are also more public transport like minibuses, known as Labi Labi or Angkutan Kota (Angkot). The Labi Labi can be found easily in medium-to-high congested roads, and The fare to ride Labi Labi is very cheap.

Media

Radio 
The city of Lhokseumawe has several radio stations:

TV channel 
Lhoksumawe City also has 18 Media TV channel (17 National dan 1 local):

References

Official Government links 
For Any information about lhokseumawe city, you can ask directly to official government link below

  Official City
  Regional Development Planning Board
  Regional Network documentation and Law information
  Auction services procurement

External links 

  Facebook Link of Lhokseumawe City

 
Populated places in Aceh